Madan Bahadur Hari Bahadur (Nepali:
मदनबहादुर हरिबहादुर) was a Nepali sitcom television series. Hari Bansha Acharya and Madan Krishna Shrestha were the script writer, director, and the main characters. The show aired on Nepal Television. Integrating political and social topics into a comedy drama, Madan Bahadur Hari Bahadur was one of the most viewed programs in Nepal. The series ended in 2010. Hari Bahadur's character is very popular and widely loved among Nepali people, it is considered one of the funniest in the country's entertainment industry. Other comedians frequently imitate this character on their shows.

Synopsis 
Madan Bahadur (Madan Krishna Shrestha) and Hari Bahadur (Hari Bansha Acharya) home village is the subject of the show. Hari Bahadur is notorious for his misdeeds, whereas Madan Bahadur is a well-liked individual. Hari Bahadur frequently attempts to accomplish something unethically, and his methods are always incredibly humorous.

Cast
Madan Krishna Shrestha as Madan Bahadur
Hari Bansha Acharya as Hari Bahadur
Mishree Thapa as Madan Bahadur's wife
Roshani Sapkota as Putali (Hari Bahadur's wife)
Raju Bhuju as Lahure 
Sharmila Sharma as Lahurini
Siru Bista as Haribahadur's buhari
Kiran K.C as Policeman
Neer Shah as Policeman
Shivahari Poudel as Hotel Sahu
Sandip Chettri as Social activist 
Shishir Rana as Thug
Kamal Gaule as Dalal

References

2000s Nepalese television series
2010s Nepalese television series